Neill Rawlins Sheridan (November 20, 1921 – October 15, 2015), nicknamed "Wild Horse," was an American professional baseball player whose 12-season career (1943–1954) largely took place in the minor leagues. An outfielder by trade, he saw his only Major League service for the  Boston Red Sox, appearing for a cup of coffee (only two games played) — one as a pinch hitter and one as a pinch runner.

On September 19, 1948, with Boston embroiled in a four-team pennant scramble, Sheridan appeared as a pinch runner for Bobby Doerr (a future Hall of Famer), in the sixth inning of an 8–6 loss to the Detroit Tigers at Briggs Stadium. One week later, he logged his only MLB at bat when he pinch hit in the ninth inning for pitcher Dave Ferriss at Yankee Stadium during a 6–2 Red Sox defeat. Facing New York Yankees' left-hander Tommy Byrne, Sheridan was called out on strikes. His Major League Baseball trial came to an end after those two games.

As a minor leaguer, however, Sheridan appeared in 1,446 games and was a mainstay of the post-World War II Pacific Coast League. He wore the uniform of five PCL teams, including both clubs in his native San Francisco Bay Area, the San Francisco Seals and the Oakland Oaks.

Sheridan died of pneumonia on October 15, 2015 in Antioch, California, aged 93.

References

External links

Nowlin, Bill, Neill Sheridan. SABR Biography Project

1921 births
2015 deaths
Baseball players from Berkeley, California
Baseball players from Sacramento, California
Boston Red Sox players
Chattanooga Lookouts players
Minneapolis Millers (baseball) players
Oakland Oaks (baseball) players
Sacramento Solons players
San Antonio Missions players
San Diego Padres (minor league) players
San Francisco Dons baseball players
San Francisco Seals (baseball) players
Seattle Rainiers players
Toronto Maple Leafs (International League) players
Vancouver Capilanos players
Victoria Tyees players
Deaths from pneumonia in California